Mazagão Atlético Clube, commonly known as Mazagão, is a Brazilian football club based in based in Mazagão, Amapá. The club's senior team is inactive since 2014, having last played in a professional match in August 2011.

History
The club was founded on 23 January 1979. Mazagão finished in the second position in the Campeonato Amapaense in 2000, losing the competition to Santos-AP.

Stadium
Mazagão Atlético Clube play their home games at Estádio Aluizio Videira, nicknamed Videirão. The stadium has a maximum capacity of 2,000 people.

References

Inactive football clubs in Brazil
Football clubs in Amapá
Association football clubs established in 1979
1979 establishments in Brazil